Fussball Club Ibach are a Swiss football team currently playing in Liga 2.,
the fourth tier in the Swiss football pyramid Group 3.

Based in Ibach, the club was formed in 1954.

Staff and board members
 Trainer: Damian Appert

External links
Official website   

Association football clubs established in 1954
Football clubs in Switzerland
Schwyz
1954 establishments in Switzerland